was a feudal domain under the Tokugawa shogunate of Edo period Japan, located in Kazusa Province (modern-day Chiba Prefecture). The domain was centered on Iino Jin’ya, a fortified residence in what is now the city of Futtsu, Chiba. It was ruled for the entirety of its history by a branch of the Hoshina clan (later Matsudaira clan) of Aizu.

History
Iino Domain was created when a 7000 koku hatamoto, Hoshina Masasada was granted an additional 10,000 koku of territory in Settsu Province after his appointment as Justicar of Osaka in 1648. On his death, 2000 koku was given to his younger son, Hoshina Masafusa, reducing the domain to 15,000 koku. However, the domain expanded again to 20,000 koku under the tenure of Hoshina Masakage. The 10th (and final) daimyō of Iino Domain, Hoshina Masaari, served as wakadoshiyori, and played an important role as a commander in the Second Chōshū expedition. However, during the Boshin War, he switched sides to the Satchō Alliance and was later appointed to judge the guilt of those who had opposed the Meiji Restoration, including many of his relatives from the Hoshina clan of Aizu. Iino Domain became Iino Prefecture on the abolition of the han system in August 1871, and subsequently part of Kisarazu Prefecture, followed by Chiba Prefecture.

The domain had a population of 21,443 people in 4375 households per the 1869 census. The domain maintained its primary residence (kamiyashiki) in Edo in Azabu.

Holdings at the end of the Edo period
As with most domains in the han system, Iino Domain consisted of several discontinuous territories calculated to provide the assigned kokudaka, based on periodic cadastral surveys and projected agricultural yields. In the case of Iino Domain, the exclave it controlled in Settsu Province was far larger than its home territory in Kazusa, and the domain maintained a secondary Jin’ya in that province.
Kazusa Province
10 villages in Sue District
2 villages in Mouda District
2 villages in Musha District
4 villages in Katori District
Settsu Province
15 villages in Teshima District
4 villages in Nose District
9 villages in Kawabe District
6 villages in Arima District
Ōmi Province
3 villages in Ika District
Tanba Province
15 villages in Amata District

List of daimyōs
  Hoshina clan (fudai) 1648–1871

References

Bolitho, Harold (1974). Treasures among men; the fudai daimyo in Tokugawa Japan. New Haven: Yale University Press.
Kodama Kōta 児玉幸多, Kitajima Masamoto 北島正元 (1966). Kantō no shohan 関東の諸藩. Tokyo: Shin Jinbutsu Ōraisha.

External links
Genealogy of the lords of Iino

Notes

Domains of Japan
1648 establishments in Japan
States and territories established in 1648
1871 disestablishments in Japan
States and territories disestablished in 1871
Kazusa Province
History of Chiba Prefecture